Shit is a village in Estakhr-e Posht Rural District, Hezarjarib District, Neka County, Mazandaran Province, Iran. At the 2006 census, its population was 948, in 180 families.

See also 
 Wikipedia:Unusual place names

References 

Populated places in Neka County